OCBC Centre is a , 52-storey skyscraper in Singapore. Serving as the current headquarters of OCBC Bank, the building was completed in 1976 and was the tallest building in the country, and South East Asia, at that time. There are two extensions, OCBC Centre South and OCBC Centre East. There is an Executive Club on one of the higher floors of the building. OCBC Centre East has food and beverage outlets.

Architecture
The building is an example of Brutalist architecture, a popular architectural style in the 1970s.

See also 
 List of tallest buildings in Singapore

References

Further reading

External links
 

1976 establishments in Singapore
Brutalist architecture in Singapore
Downtown Core (Singapore)
I. M. Pei buildings
Modernist architecture
Office buildings completed in 1976
Raffles Place
Skyscraper office buildings in Singapore
OCBC Bank
20th-century architecture in Singapore